The Federal Polytechnic, Namoda is based in Kaura-Namoda, Zamfara State, Nigeria. 
It was founded in June 1983 by President Shehu Shagari, and has over 5,000 students. The Polytechnic is accredited by the National Board for Technical Education. It provides full-time and part-time courses in Technology, Applied Science, Commerce and Management, leading to National Diplomas and Higher National Diplomas.
The polytechnic is the only tertiary educational institution in the town of 300,000.
In November 2009, the Africa Youths International Development Foundation signed a memorandum of understanding to provide financial support to upgrade the facilities.

Vision 
To be an Institution committed to producing qualitative human capital for self-reliance and national development

See also
List of polytechnics in Nigeria
Education in Nigeria

References

External links
Official site of the Federal Polytechnic, Kaura Namoda 

Zamfara State
Federal polytechnics in Nigeria
Educational institutions established in 1983
1983 establishments in Nigeria